Bhama Shah (1547–1600) was a noted general, minister and close aide of Maharana Pratap Singh. The financial support provided by him allowed Maharana Pratap to restore his army and reclaim much of his lost territory.

Biography
Bhamashah was born on 28 June 1547 in Oswal Jain  family. His father Bharmal Kawedia was Qiledar of Ranthambore Fort appointed by Rana Sangram Singh and was later prime minister under Rana Udai Singh II.

Bhamashah was the Nagar Seth of Chittor. After the costly Battle of Haldighati, Maharana Pratap's financial situation was dire. Bhamashah and his brother Tarachand gave 2,00,00,000 gold coins and 25,00,00,000 silver rupees to Maharana Pratap. They attacked Mughal army camps and partially financed Rana from the gained wealth. Maharana Pratap was able to organize an army and furthered his campaign against the Mughals.

Bhamashah was appointed as the prime minister by Maharana Pratap and Tarachand was appointed as a governor of 'Godwad' region after the Battle of Haldighati.

'Sadri' was founded by Tarachand where he had constructed many buildings. Sadri is considered the gate way of Mewar to Marwar.

Bhamashah died in 1600. At the time of his death he was Mewar's treasurer under Amar Singh I. Descendants of Bhamashah also served as prime ministers of the Ranas of Udaipur for a few generations. His son Jiwashah was the chief during the rule of Rana Amar Singh, and grandson Akshayraj was the prime minister during the rule of Rana Karan Singh and his descendant Rana Jagat Singh. His descendants still live in Udaipur.

Legacy
Bhamashah's birth anniversary or Bhamashah Jayanti is celebrated on 29 June every year.

There is a memorial in Udaipur to him. Government of India issued a postage stamp in his honor in year 2000.

The Maharana Mewar Charitable Foundation has instituted the "Bhama Shah Award" to honour Rajasthani students securing the highest percentage in select departments in the universities of Rajasthan, in recognition of selfless sacrifice, astute financial management, and devotion to duty.

A Bhamashah Yojana bas been started on his name by government of Rajasthan.

The 1926 silent film Diwan Bhamansha by Mohan Dayaram Bhavnani was based on Bhamashah's life; Another film about the general, titled Bhamashah, was released in 2017.

References

Further reading
DeshGaurav BhamaShah – Late Shri Harilal Upadhyay, 1976
The tribes and Cates of the Central Provinces of India, 1916, by Robert Vane Russell, See p. 111-161, history and origins of the Shrimal Oswal Jain bania caste.

People from Rajasthan
16th-century Indian Jains
History of Rajasthan
Maharana Pratap
1600 deaths
Indian warriors
1542 births